Tomás Galfrascoli (29 December 1925 – 30 June 2014) was an Argentine sailor. He competed in the 5.5 Metre event at the 1952 Summer Olympics.

References

External links
 

1925 births
2014 deaths
Argentine male sailors (sport)
Olympic sailors of Argentina
Sailors at the 1952 Summer Olympics – 5.5 Metre
Sportspeople from Buenos Aires